2009 World Fencing Championships was held at the Antalya Expo Center in Antalya, Turkey. The event took place from September 30 to October 8, 2009.

Medal summary

Men's events

Women's events

Medal table

Results overview

Men

Foil individual
3 October - Final

Épée individual
4 October - Final

Sabre individual
5 October - Final

Foil team
6 October - Final

Epée team
7 October - Final

Sabre team
8 October - Final

Women

Sabre individual
3 October - Final

Foil individual
4 October - Final

Epée individual
5 October - Final

Sabre team
6 October - Final

Foil team
7 October - Final

Épée team
8 October - Final

See also
Fencing at the 2008 Summer Olympics

External links
 Official Website
 Results

World Fencing Championships
W
Fencing Championships
World 2009
Fencing
21st century in Antalya
September 2009 sports events in Europe
October 2009 sports events in Europe